Karin Praxmarer ( Kusatz; 9 July 1944 – 10 December 2021) was an Austrian politician. A member of the Freedom Party of Austria, she served in the National Council from 1986 to 1996 and again in 1999.

References

1944 births
2021 deaths
Freedom Party of Austria politicians
Members of the National Council (Austria)
People from Zwettl
Place of death missing
20th-century Austrian politicians
20th-century Austrian women politicians